Jagat Murari (5 October 1924 – 13 April 2007) was a distinguished Indian documentary filmmaker, known well for his contributions to Indian cinema as a producer, director and, above all, educator. He played a pioneering role in a number of key film institutions in India, including the Film & Television Institute of India (FTII), the National Film Archive of India (NFAI), and the Directorate of Film Festivals (DFF). Murari is well remembered for nurturing young, talented students as head of FTII, Pune between 1962 and 1971, many of whom are now well known names in the Bollywood industry, including Jaya Bhaduri, Shabana Azmi, Adoor Gopalakrishnan and Subhash Ghai.

Life and career

Filmmaker 
Murari earned a Masters in Physics at Patna University and then, feeling that his background in physics would be useful in cinema, he obtained a Masters in Cinema in 1947 from the University of Southern California, Los Angeles. His first Hollywood internship was on Orson Welles' film, Macbeth. He returned to India early the next year and joined the Films Division as a deputy director just a few months after its creation. He then become a director, and then assistant producer.

Many of his films won national and international awards and were screened at some of the world's most prestigious film festivals (see Selected filmography below). His landmark film Mahabalipuram was shown at the International Film Festival in Berlin and at the Second International Art Film Festival in New York in 1952. In 1953, it went to the Edinburgh Film Festival. Mahabalipuram and Cave Temples of India – 1 (Buddhist), were shown in China in 1955 for a Festival of Indian Films, which was considered an important step in bringing the people of India and China closer together in friendship. By the time he left the Films Division in 1961, he had written and directed 37 films. Between 1959 and 1961, he produced 43 films.

Educator 
Murari joined the Film and Television Institute of India (FTII) in Pune soon after its creation in 1961 and worked there until 1971. Initially, he was the Professor of Direction, but after Gajanand Jagirdar resigned as Principal in 1961, he took on the role. In the 1960s, the FTII trained actors, directors, cinematographers, and sound technicians, including Jaya Bhaduri, Shatrughan Sinha, Rehana Sultan, Adoor Gopalakrishnan, Mani Kaul, Subhash Ghai, and K. K. Mahajan. As an educator, he filled India's prolific but chaotic film industry with a greater degree of professionalism and skill by introducing a stream of highly trained directors, technicians, and actors.

Murari taught courses in documentary filmmaking and film direction, among other subjects as teaching Principal. He was very popular for his polite, kind-hearted nature and his dedication to his students. According to Subhash Ghai, he was "a thorough gentleman who cared for his students" and constantly strove to "reinvent teaching methods in filmmaking at FTII."

In 1962, the government asked Murari to start the National Film Archives of India (NFAI) in Pune, because the Film Institute needed a good film collection for educational purposes. Murari established the vision for this new organization, shaped its objectives, and secured its funding. Initially a subset of the Film Institute, the Archives formally opened in 1964, with a small office in the Film Institute. It used the Institute's film vaults and hosted screenings in its theaters. He ran the Archives until 1967.

In 1972, he returned to the Films Division, where he produced more films. His film Homi Bhabha - A Scientist in Action won the National Film Award in the Experimental Category in 1973. Another film from this period, Lost Child, based on the story by the well-known Indian writer Mulk Raj Anand, also won recognition.

In 1973, he established the Film Festival Directorate, where he hosted international film festivals as well as the National Film Awards program. He went back to the Film Institute in 1976 and retired three years later. After that, he returned to documentary filmmaking, working as a producer, director and scriptwriter. He made 10 films in those years, some for the Films Division, some for other organisations. He was still behind the camera at the age of 70. He continued to be involved in the film field as an advisor until shortly before his death.

Murari died on 13 April 2007 at the age of 85 after battling cancer. He is survived by his wife Lakshmi Murari, three sons, Ashok, Anoop and Vivek, and a daughter, Radha Chadha.

Selected filmography

Awards 

He won the first President's Gold Medal in 1954 for his 1952 documentary film Mahabalipuram. He also won several other national awards and international acclaim at festivals in Berlin, Venice, Edinburgh, San Francisco and Cannes.

Notes 

1924 births
2007 deaths
Indian documentary filmmakers
Artists from Patna
USC School of Cinematic Arts alumni
Deaths from cancer in India
20th-century Indian film directors
Indian male screenwriters
Film directors from Bihar
Film producers from Bihar
20th-century Indian dramatists and playwrights
20th-century Indian male writers
20th-century Indian screenwriters